To Pathos Einai Aformi (Greek: Το Πάθος Είναι Αφορμή; English: Passion is a motive) is the title of the tenth studio album by the popular Greek artist Peggy Zina, released on May 23, 2009, by Minos EMI.

Track list

Charts
In March 2009, IFPI announced that it would close its charts for a period of time in order to re-new the charting system, thus it is not possible to track the chart and sales records of To Pathos Einai Aformi. On July 17, 2009, IFPI confirmed via email that the album had reached gold status in Greece. On September 20, 2009, IFPI confirmed via email that the album had reached platinum status in Greece. In an article in Hello magazine in January 2010 announcing a planned repackage edition of the album, it was revealed that the album had reached 2× Platinum status. The repackaged edition never materialised.

References

2009 albums
Greek-language albums
Peggy Zina albums
Minos EMI albums